Panzer Leader (literally "Memories of a Soldier") is an autobiography by Heinz Guderian. The book, written during his imprisonment by the Allies after the war, describes Guderian's service in the Panzer arm of the Heer before and during World War II.

The most prominent English language version is the 1952 translation by Constantine Fitzgibbon, with a foreword by B. H. Liddell Hart. The Da Capo Press editions have an additional introduction by Kenneth Macksey.

Known editions

See also 
Myth of the clean Wehrmacht
Panzer Battles
Armored warfare
Eastern Front (World War II)
Hans von Luck

External links
 Copy of book on the Internet Archive

World War II memoirs
Propaganda legends
1952 non-fiction books